Sudanese cuisine is greatly affected by the historical cross-cultural influences of Arab, Nubian, Egyptian, Turkish, and Levantine cuisine in Sudan. Many Sudanese foods have been around for thousands of years. The most common meats eaten are lamb and chicken, in accordance with the Muslim halal laws. Most meals are communal and often shared with family, neighbors, and guests, as part of Sudanese hospitality.

There is also  (or ), a fermented bread similar to Ethiopian injera, but thinner and smaller.

Influences 
Egyptian cuisine has greatly influenced Sudanese cuisine. , a soft white cheese, is also eaten.

Turkish cuisine has also influenced Sudanese cuisine, giving it a distinct flavor. Turkish foods found in Sudanese cuisine include kebabs, kofta, and shawarma, as well as sweets such as baklava. Levantine and Egyptian sweets also entered Sudanese cuisine and are known as oriental (or Levantine) sweets.

Appetizers
They are eaten raw. A peanut salad called  is also eaten.

Soups and stews 
Most Sudanese  will have either meat or other vegetables or legumes.

Beverages 

The most popular drink is tap or bottled water, traditionally offered free of charge for anyone in large claypots in the streets. Strong coffee, sometimes served in Sudanese coffee pots called , and black tea, often with milk, are also popular. These are sold in the streets by "tea ladies". Especially on hot days, traditional cold hibiscus tea, called , is made in homes.

Alcoholic beverages 
Historically, Sudan was one of the few predominantly Muslim countries that allowed traditional and Western alcoholic drinks. In the 20th century, some Sudanese were influenced by Europeans and began drinking whiskey and beer.

In September 1983, former Sudanese President Gaafar Nimeiry enacted Sharia, marking the occasion by dumping alcohol into the Nile river. Since then, the purveying, consumption, and purchasing of alcohol has been banned in Sudan. Being lashed 40 times is the penalty for breaking the prohibition on alcohol. Nevertheless, an alcoholic gin made from dates, continued to be illegally brewed in defiance of Sharia. In 2019, the Transitional Government passed a new law, allowing alcoholic beverages for non-Muslims.

Gallery

See also

 List of African cuisines

References

Further reading
 Susannah Wright. Sudan (Ebiz Guides). Madrid: MTH Multimedia S.L., 2005. , ; pp. 203–205.

External links

Sudan Cookbook 
Food of Sudan from the Sudan Embassy in Washington DC
Sudanese recipes from a missionary trip

 
North African cuisine